Strathgryffe or Gryffe Valley is a strath centred on the River Gryffe in the west central Lowlands of Scotland. The River Gryffe passes through the council areas of Inverclyde and Renfrewshire, rising in Kilmacolm and joining the Black Cart Water between Houston and Inchinnan.

The river and its strath extend over the historic county of Renfrewshire. Strathgryfe, anciently a feudal lordship, is associated historically with the origins of the county and anciently the name was used not only for the Strath of Gryffe itself, but for a traditional Province covering the whole of what later became Renfrewshire.

History

The lands of Strathgryffe were granted by King David I to Walter fitz Alan, first High Steward of Scotland, and founder of the Stewart family in Scotland, probably in the 1150s. The Stewarts would be based in Strathgryffe for centuries thereafter.

The introduction of Sheriffs created a further source of political authority in Strathgryffe. In the mid 19th century, local government reforms replaced the ancient provinces by new Counties (shires), aligned to sheriffdom boundaries. As the sheriff for Strathgryffe had based himself in Renfrew, the county was called county of Renfrew.

Name
A Strath is a wide glen. The term is rendered in Scots Gaelic as 'Srath' and in the ancient Modern Welsh as 'Ystrad'.

'Stragrif' is mentioned in the 1169 charter of Paisley Abbey, which placed the churches of the area under the control of the new abbey. Later, the name 'Gryff' is recorded in the Military Survey of Scotland 1747–1755, compiled by William Roy, a predecessor to the Ordnance Survey maps of Great Britain. However it seems that 'Gryfe' was the established usage until more recent times.

The 'Gryffe' spelling is becoming the predominant usage in the area, seen for example in new signposts showing the name of the river and the names of organisations such as the Gryffe Valley Rotary Club and Gryffe High School in Houston, Renfrewshire.

Settlements
There are a number of villages in Strathgryffe, varying considerably in size. The following straddle or are immediately adjacent to the River Gryffe:
 Kilmacolm
 Quarrier's Village (Kilmacolm civil parish)
 Bridge of Weir
 Houston (including Craigends on the South-east bank of the river)
 Crosslee (Houston and Killellan civil parish)

Geography
The geography of the area is a contrasting mix of green fields surrounding the river, with rough moorland in the higher areas, particularly Clyde Muirshiel Regional Park.

Notes

References

 
Feudalism in Scotland
Glens of Scotland
Landforms of Renfrewshire
Landforms of Inverclyde